Electro-Harmonix (also commonly referred to as EHX) is a New York City-based company that makes electronic audio processors and sells rebranded vacuum tubes. The company was founded by Mike Matthews in 1968. It is best known for a series of guitar effects pedals introduced in the 1970s and 1990s. EHX also made a line of guitars in the 1970s.

During the mid-1970s, Electro-Harmonix established itself as a manufacturer of guitar effects pedals. It was the first company to manufacture, and market affordable state-of-the art "stomp-boxes" for guitarist and bassists, such as the first stomp-box flanger (Electric Mistress), the first analog echo/delay unit with no moving parts (Memory Man), the first guitar synthesizer in pedal form (Micro Synthesizer), and the first tube-amp distortion simulator (Hot Tubes). In 1980, Electro-Harmonix also designed and marketed one of the first digital delay/looper pedals (16-Second Digital Delay) and a line of guitars in the 1970s.

Company history

Founding years (1967–1968) 
Electro-Harmonix was founded by rhythm and blues keyboard player Mike Matthews in October 1968 in New York City with $1,000. He took a job as a salesman for IBM in 1967, but shortly afterwards, in partnership with Bill Berko, an audio repairman who claimed to have his own custom circuit for a fuzz pedal, he jobbed construction of the new pedal to a contracting house and began distributing the pedals under a deal with the Guild Guitar Company. Fuzzboxes were in demand following a trail of hits involving their sound, including "(I Can't Get No) Satisfaction" by The Rolling Stones two years before (the pedal's stomp switch can be clearly heard at 0:35 before Richards plays the song's trademark riff), and recent popularization of Jimi Hendrix. The latter connection resulted in the pedals being branded the 'Foxey Lady'. In addition several low priced models of acoustic guitars were sold.

Following the departure of his partner, Matthews was introduced to inventor and electric engineer Robert Myer through IBM colleagues. Together they designed a circuit to create a distortion-free sustain. A simple line booster used by Myers in testing to preamplify the guitar's signal was also manufactured from 1969 as the Linear Power Booster (LPB-1), and has continued production in present day.

First products
The Axis fuzz pedal, also sold under the name 'Foxey Lady' for the Guild guitar company, and LPB-1 Linear Power Booster were the first products in 1969. The LPB-1 massively boosted a guitar signal & could be used to overdrive an amplifier, resulting in a raw distorted sound, full of sustain and harmonics. Several similar devices, which sold well, followed, such as the Treble Booster and Bass Booster.
The Mike Matthews Freedom Amp, a portable guitar amp powered by 40 "D" batteries, was popular in many venues that lacked an A/C power source.

Change of direction 

Electro-Harmonix stopped making pedals in the mid-1980s, and in the early 1990s started selling vacuum tubes re-branded with its name for guitar amplifiers, which it had also been making since the 1970s. However, due to demand and the high prices guitarists were paying for old 1970s pedals on the vintage market, it reissued the more popular old pedals in the mid-1990s, including the Big Muff Pi and Small Stone. In 2002 it started designing new pedals to add to its range. Company policy was that all reissued effects remained as close as possible to the original, vintage designs; however, casings, knobs and especially the old-fashioned mini-jack power plug were not up to later standards. In 2006 the smaller and more standardized "micro" and "nano" effect lines using surface-mount circuit components were introduced. Circuit board manufacture was outsourced, and the pedals assembled in New York.

Effects pedals 

 Electro-Harmonix produces pedals with many different types of sound manipulation suitable for guitar, bass, vocal, keyboard, and other instruments. It also sells rebranded vacuum tubes carrying the Electro-Harmonix brand name.

Big Muff 

In 1969 Bob Myer and Mike Matthews designed the Big Muff Pi, a fuzzbox that added a bass-heavy sustain to any guitar sound. It is described by the company as "the finest harmonic distortion-sustain device developed to date". Originally this was intended to be a pedal that would mimic the fuzz tones of Jimi Hendrix and other guitarists at the time, but the result was a mix of a fuzz and distortion pedal with a very heavy sound. It also made small amps sound much better and allowed distortion at any volume.

The pedal sold well and was used by Carlos Santana, Pink Floyd's David Gilmour, Alex Lifeson of Rush and, later, Metallica's bassist Cliff Burton, The Jesus and Mary Chain, and in the 1990s KoRn's rhythm guitarist Munky, Vicente Freitas, Jack White of The White Stripes, J Mascis of Dinosaur Jr., The Edge of U2, and Billy Corgan (on The Smashing Pumpkins landmark album, Siamese Dream). The band Mudhoney titled their debut EP Superfuzz Bigmuff.

Although the first Big Muff production date was for many years cited as 1971, the first version of the Big Muff was actually sold in 1969 as a hand-made "perf board" version. A production version with an etched PCB board was made in early 1970. Mike Matthews was friends with Jimi Hendrix and claims Jimi bought one from Manny's Music in New York, shortly after they were released and had one in the Electric Lady Studios shortly before Jimi's death in 1970. Several variations of the Big Muff Pi followed throughout the 1970s.  Electro-Harmonix produced a reissue assembled in New York City; until 2009 it produced a version made by Sovtek in Russia which provided a slightly different tone. The Bass Big Muff replaced the Russian version.

Several other variations (some of which are not actually Big Muffs) of the pedal were in production , including the Metal Muff (intended to achieve the higher gain Metal guitar sound), the Double Muff, which incorporates the original Muff Fuzz circuit, twice in series with a single overdrive control for each circuit, providing the user either with a cascaded 'Double Muff' sound or the original Muff Fuzz circuit, the Little Big Muff, a smaller version, and a variation in circuit, of the NYC Big Muff, which produces yet another variation in sound, and the Big Muff with Tone Wicker, which is similar to the 2008 revision NYC Big Muff, with two added features: a tone bypass switch allowing you to bypass the tone control and a switch that adjusts the frequency of three high frequency filters in the circuit. The Germanium 4 Big Muff Pi is a dual unit, housing an overdrive and a distortion circuit featuring 2 Germanium transistors each, and simulating a dying battery with a Volt control, which characteristically affects the sound of the distortion.

In 2018, Electro-Harmonix released three vintage Big Muff re-issues the Green Russian Big Muff, the Op-Amp Big Muff, and the Triangle Big Muff, and in early 2020 the Ram's Head Big Muff  was reissued.

Phasers, chorus and flanger 

Electro-Harmonix often produces a range of pedals based on a single effect, and then combines two or more into higher end units. For instance, the Epitome combines the Micro POG, Stereo Electric Mistress, and Holy Grail Plus into one effect unit.

The widely used Small Stone phase shifter is a 4-stage phaser designed by David Cockerell, whom Electro-Harmonix hired from his former employer EMS. The phased sounds of French composer Jean-Michel Jarre depended heavily on the Small Stone unit. It was reissued years later by EHX and a smaller version of the pedal was eventually introduced in a 'Nano' casing (officially called the "Small Stone (Nano Chassis)").

The Small Clone chorus is a very popular chorus pedal, used by Kurt Cobain, both live and in studio.  Like the Small Stone, it is issued in both the standard size and two different smaller versions (the Nano Clone is based on the Clone Theory circuit, while the neo clone is the standard).

The Electric Mistress is an analog flanger. It had first been sold in 1976 and was by that the first flanger in pedal format. The Deluxe version has been reissued and is still in production, although in 2015, a new Deluxe Electric Mistress was introduced in the company's smaller "XO" casing. As well, there are two digital recreations called NEO Mistress and Stereo Electric Mistress. Except for the very first blue/red version the Electric Mistress featured a "Filter Matrix mode" which allowed the user to freeze it at any point in the flange, offering distinctive chime-like tones. On the Neo and Stereo Mistress, this is achieved at a certain setting on the "rate" knob. Notable users include David Gilmour, Todd Rundgren, Alex Lifeson, Robin Trower, Andy Summers of The Police, J Mascis of Dinosaur Jr. and Red Hot Chili Peppers guitarist John Frusciante.

The Flanger Hoax pedal is a more advanced unit, allowing further control of the various parameters of phaser, flanger and chorusing effects.

The Polychorus allows highly adjustable chorus, flanger, filter matrix, and slapback echo effects.  Notable users include Cobain (i.e. "Radio Friendly Unit Shifter"), Adrian Belew, and more recently Ryan Jarman of The Cribs.

Electro-Harmonix's 'XO' line added the Stereo Polyphase, an analog optical envelope- and LFO-controlled phase shifter.

Delays and loopers 
Electro-Harmonix also manufactures delay pedals, including the Deluxe Memory Man, Stereo Memory Man with Hazarai, and #1 Echo. They also produce the '2880' pedal, which allows complex looping and multi-track overdubbing. The #1 Echo provides basic digital echo capability, while the Deluxe Memory Man provides more control over length, repeats, etc. The Deluxe Memory Man also includes built-in chorusing and vibrato effects. The digital Stereo Memory Man with Hazarai (distinct from the Analog Deluxe Memory Man) also includes reverse echo effect and looping/overdubbing. The Memory Toy and Memory Boy delay pedals are essentially smaller budget versions of the Deluxe Memory Man. The Memory Man effects pedal was used by Edge from the band U2 to record the songs "I Will Follow" and "Sunday Bloody Sunday". One of the singles from the band Deerhunter's 2010 album Halcyon Digest was named "Memory Boy".

Reverb 
The Holy Grail, Holy Grail Plus, Holier Grail (discontinued), Holiest Grail (discontinued), Oceans 11, and Cathedral pedals produce reverberation. These cover a range of capability, including reverb length, room simulation, etc. The company's Holy Stain multi-effects pedal also includes two different types of reverb.

Tremolo and vibrato 
Tremolo and vibrato are included as well, in both solid-state and vacuum tube options. These are available in the Stereo Pulsar (solid-state) and Wiggler (tube) pedals.

Octave, pitch and synthesizer 

Also available are a series of pitch modulation pedals. These include the Micro Synthesizer (for bass or guitar),  HOG (Harmonic Octave Generator), POG (Polyphonic Octave Generator, released in 2005), POG 2 (2009), Micro POG (in an XO casing), Nano POG, Octave Multiplexer, Pitch Fork, and Pitch Fork+.

The POG line of pedals has been used extensively by several prominent 2000s-era rock guitarists, including Jack White (of The White Stripes, The Raconteurs, et al.), and Josh Homme (of Queens of the Stone Age, Them Crooked Vultures, et al.).

Envelope, EQ and compression 
Electro-Harmonix offers several pedals for envelope/equalization modulation. Amongst them are the Bassballs (appropriately named for its intended use with bass guitars), Doctor Q and the Q-Tron. Another pedal of note was the vacuum tube-powered Black Finger Compressor which adds distortion-free sustain to the sound and which appeared in the mid-1970s. The solid-state White Finger followed. In 2016, the Tone Corset was released as the latest analog compressor.

In 1995, Electro-Harmonix owner Mike Matthews commissioned Mike Beigel, former owner of Musitronics Corp. and inventor of the Mu-tron III envelope filter, to design a new envelope filter using the same analog circuitry as the original Mu-tron III, thus keeping the sound as close to the original as possible while adding new features to bring the effect into the new millennium. The pedal featured the same controls as the Mu-tron III and incorporated a "Boost" feature, which activates an internal pre-amp and changes the function of the gain knob giving the Q-Tron a sound almost identical to the Mu-tron III. Another feature added to Q-Tron was an effects loop switch and attack response switch. Units with these features are called the Q-Tron+. A smaller more compact version, the Mini Q-Tron, is also available, as well as an even smaller version, the Micro Q-Tron. Electro-Harmonix also currently produces the C0ck Fight a talking wah filter with fuzz and a modulated low-pass filter, the Blurst

Other pedals 
Electro-Harmonix currently manufactures over one hundred other pedals.

These include the Graphic Fuzz (a fuzzbox which includes an EQ section), the Octavix (octave fuzz), the Frequency Analyzer (which creates ring modulation) and the Voice Box, a vocoder. The Voice Box has been included in a series of demonstration videos produced by Jack Conte.

Electro-Harmonix has also made a few small power amp pedals for use as a simple guitar amplifier. The EHX 22 Caliber was a 22 watt solid state pedal capable of driving either an 8 ohm or 16 ohm speaker cabinet. It has been discontinued. The 22 Caliber was replaced in the lineup by the EHX 44 Magnum, a similar pedal capable of driving the same speaker load, but at a 44 watt output. The 5MM power amplifier, introduced in 2019, is a similar pedal, with a reduced output of 2.5 watts, but with the ability to run on a common 9-volt power supply, as opposed to the 24-volt supply needed to power the 44 Magnum. 

2016, Electro-Harmonix reissued the MIG-50 a 50 watt tube amplifier head and later the 2x12 speaker cabinet.

Several pedals produced in the decades prior have also been discontinued, many of which are still in high demand for their unique sound.

Acoustic guitars 

These guitars were only available from EH for a very short time in 1974. They were available through a special offer for $87.50 with the purchase of $50 or more in certain scratch-n-dent EH products. The list price was $187.50. They didn't buy out a warehouse and put their name on them. These are the model names and descriptions: EH-7010 EH acoustic guitar (mahogany back and sides), EH-7020 EH acoustic guitar (D-28 copy, rosewood back and sides), and EH-7030 EH acoustic guitar (D-41 copy, rosewood back and sides, pearloid binding and inlay, 3 piece back).
They bought them from Moridaira/ Morris Guitar who at the time were the best guitar maker in Japan, making guitars for Fender and many big companies. 
They put the EH on the guitars. The guitar, marked with the brand "Brody" is another Japanese-made acoustic that EH had made for them in the 70s. Mike Matthews has stated that Brody was his mother's maiden name.  Unlike the other EH guitar, this one is of a lesser quality.

Notable users
Kurt Cobain: Big Muff, Echo Flanger, Small Clone, Stereo Polychorus
Jamie Cook: Big Muff, Little Big Muff, Pulsar, HOG Foot Controller, Deluxe Memory Man, Holiest Grail
Billy Corgan: Op-Amp Big Muff, Polyphase, Electric Mistress, Small Stone
Chris Cornell: Deluxe Memory Man, Hog Guitar Synthesizer
Brad Delson & Mike Shinoda: Polyphase, HOG, Holy Sustain, Memory Man, Cathedral 
The Edge: Deluxe Memory Man, Big Muff
Flea: Big Muff
Nils Frahm: #1 Echo
John Frusciante: Big Muff, Holy Grail Reverb, English Muff'n, Electric Mistress Flanger, POG
Noel Gallagher: Micro POG
David Gilmour: Big Muff, Electric Mistress
Goodiepal:POG 2 Polyphonic Octave Generator
Jonny Greenwood: Nano Small Stone Phase Shifter
Peter Hook: Clone Theory
Daniel Kessler: Holy Grail Reverb
Andreas Kisser: Big Muff
Justin Lockey: Holy Grail Plus, Micro POG, Nano Double Muff
Doug Martsch: Memory Boy, 16 Second Digital Delay
J. Mascis: Ram's Head Big Muff, Deluxe Electric Mistress, POG 2 Polyphonic Octave Generator
Mike McCready: Micro POG, POG 2 Polyphonic Octave
Brian Molko: #1 Echo
Mark Mothersbaugh: Frequency Analyzer
Lockett Pundt: Big Muff, Little Big Muff, Classic Holy Grail Reverb
Omar Rodríguez-López: Small Stone Phase Shifter, Deluxe Memory Man, Memory Boy, Poly Chorus, Holy Grail, Big Muff
Kurt Rosenwinkel: HOG
Kevin Shields: Big Muff Pi
Robert Smith: Electric Mistress, Deluxe Memory Man
Mark Speer: Holy Grail
Kim Thayil: Micro POG
Alex Turner: Deluxe Memory Man
Jeff Tuttle: Small Stone, Holy Grail, Small Clone, POG, Big Muff
Jack White: Big Muff, Big Muff Pi with Tone Wicker, POG, Bassballs, Holy Grail Nano Reverb
Thom Yorke: Holy Grail, Iron Lung Vocoder, 45000 Multi-Track Looping Recorder

References

External links
Electro-Harmonix
An Interview with Mike Matthews
The EH Man's Electro-Harmonix Extravaganza (vintage EH information)
The Mistress Mystery Page (vintage Electric Mistress information)

Guitar effects manufacturing companies
Guitar amplifier manufacturers
Audio amplifier manufacturers
Guitar amplification tubes
Manufacturing companies based in New York City
Audio equipment manufacturers of the United States